Robert Freiherr von Heine-Geldern (16 July 1885 - 25/26 May 1968), known after 1919 as Robert Heine-Geldern, was a noted Austrian ethnologist, ancient historian, and archaeologist, and a grandnephew of poet Heinrich Heine.

Biography 
Heine-Geldern was born in Grub, Austria, and was a descendant of Gustav Heine von Geldern. He studied first at the University of Munich, then art history and ethnography under Father Wilhelm Schmidt (1868-1954) at the University of Vienna. In 1910 he traveled to the India / Burma boundary to study local populations, completing his thesis in 1914 on The Mountain Tribes of Northeastern Burma.

Heine-Geldern performed military service during World War I, then worked at the Naturhistorisches Museum in Vienna. His research combined ethnological, pre-historical and archaeological concepts, and in 1923 pioneered the field of Southeast Asian anthropology with his chapter "Sϋdostasien" in G. Buschan's Illustrierte Völkerkunde. He began teaching at the University of Vienna in 1927, where he became Professor in 1931. From 1938 through World War II, he lived as a refugee in New York City, where he worked at the American Museum of Natural History. At this time he was instrumental in creation of the Southeast Asia Institute in the United States (1941). He returned to Vienna in 1950 where he joined the Ethnology Institute. He died in Vienna.

Heine-Geldern was active in starting Southeast Asian studies as an academic field, and his essay on "Conceptions of State and Kingship in Southeast Asia," (1942) is now classic. He was awarded a medal by the Viking Fund, and was a member of the Austrian Academy of Sciences, Royal Asiatic Society, Royal Anthropological Institute, and the École française d'Extrême-Orient.

Selected works 
 "Gibt es eine austroasiatische Rasse?", Archiv für Anthropologie (XLVI), 1921, pp. 79–99.
 "Südostasien," in G. Buschan (ed.), Illustrierte Völkerkunde, (Stuttgart: Strecker und Schröder, 1923), II, i, pp. 689–968.
 Altjavanische Bronzen aus dem Besitz der Ethnographischen Sammlung des Naturhistorischen Museums in Wien, (Wien: C. W.Stern,1925), Artis Thesaurus I.
 "Eine Szene aus dem Sutasoma - Jataka auf hinterindischen und indonesischen Schwertgriffen," IPEK, Jahrbuch für Prahistorische und Ethnographische Kunst (1), 1925, pp. 198–238.
 "Die Steinzeit Südostasiens," Mitteilungen der Anthropologischen Gesellschaft in Wien (LVII), 1927, pp. 47–54.
 "Ein Beitrag zur Chronologic des Neolithikums in Südostasien," in W. Koppers (ed.), Publication d'Hommage Offerte au P. W. Schmidt (Wien: Mechithaπsten-Congregations-Buchdruckerei, 1928), pp. 809–843.
 "Die Megalithen Südostasiens und ihre Bedeutung für die Klärung der Megalithenfrage in Europa und Polynesien," Anthropos (XXIII), 1928, pp. 276–315.
 "Weltbild und Bauform in Südostasien," Wiener Beiträge zur Kunst und Kultur Asiens (IV), 1928-1929, pp. 28–78.
 "Urheimat und früheste Wanderungen der Austronesier," Anthropos (XXVII), 1932, pp. 543–619.
 "Vorgeschichtliche Grundlagen der kolonialindischen Kunst," Wiener Beiträge zur Kunst- und Kulturgeschichte (VIII), 1934, pp. 5–4θ.
 "The Archeology and Art of Sumatra," in E. M. Loeb (ed.), Sumatra: Its History and People (Vienna: University of Vienna, 1935), pp. 305–331.
 "L'art prébouddhique de la Chine et de l'Asie du Sud-Est et son influence en Océanie," Revue des Arts Asiatiques (XI), 1937, pp. 177–206.
 "Conceptions of State and Kingship in Southeast Asia," Far Eastern Quarterly (II), 1942, pp. 15–30. Revised version: Ithaca: Southeast Asia Program Data Paper #18, Cornell University, 1956.
 A Survey of Studies on Southeast Asia at American Universities and Colleges (New York: East Indies Institute of America, 1943).
 "Prehistoric Research in the Netherlands Indies," in P. Honig and F. Verdoorn (eds.), Science and Scientists in the Netherlands Indies (New York: Board for the Netherlands Indies, Surinam and Curaçao, 1945). Reprint: (New York: Southeast Asia Institute, 1945), pp. 129–167.
 "Research on Southeast Asia: Problems and Suggestions," American Anthropologist (XLVIII), 1946, pp. 149–174.
 "The Drum named Makalamau," in India Antigua. A Volume of Oriental Studies Presented to J. P. Vogel (Leyden: E. J. Brill, 1947), pp. 167–179.
 "Indonesian Art," United Asia (I), 1949, pp. 402–411.
 Significant parallels in the symbolic arts of Southern Asia and Middle America, 1951.
 "Bronzegeräte auf Flores," Anthropos (XLIX), 1954, pp. 683–685.
 "Herkunft und Ausbreitung der Hochkulturen," Almanach der Österreichischen Akademie der Wissenschaften, 1955, p. 105.
 "The Coming of the Aryans and the End of the Harappa Civilization," Man, Vol 56, pp136–140, October 1956.
 "Zwei alte Weltanschauungen und ihre kulturgeschichΐliche Bedeutung," Anzeiger der phil.- hist. Klasse der Österreichischen Akademie der Wissenschaften (No. 17), 1957, pp. 251–262.
 "Steinurnen- und Tonurnenbestattung in Südostasien," Der Schlern (No. 32), 1958, pp. 135–138.

References 
 Gérald Gaillard, The Routledge Dictionary of Anthropologists, translated by Peter James Bowman and James Bowman, Routledge, 2004, p. 223. .
 Vinigi L. Grottanelli, "Robert Heine-Geldern's Contribution to Historical Ethnology", Current Anthropology, Vol. 10, No. 4 (Oct., 1969), pp. 374–376.
 Claire Holt, "In Memoriam: Robert Heine-Geldern", Indonesia 6 (October 1968), 188-192.
 Verena Neller: Robert Heine-Gelderns Exilzeit in den USA 1938–1949 in: Andre Gingrich; Peter Rohrbacher (Hg.), Völkerkunde zur NS-Zeit aus Wien (1938–1945): Institutionen, Biographien und Praktiken in Netzwerken (Phil.-hist. Kl., Sitzungsberichte 913; Veröffentlichungen zur Sozialanthropologie 27/3). Wien: Verlag der ÖAW 2021, S. 1529–1652. doi:10.1553/978OEAW86700

External links 
 Heine-Geldern, Robert Freiherr von on Austria-Forum.

See also 
 Heine

1885 births
1968 deaths
Austrian archaeologists
Austrian Mesoamericanists
Barons of Austria
Mesoamerican archaeologists
Mesoamerican anthropologists
20th-century Mesoamericanists
20th-century archaeologists
Archaeologists of South Asia
Southeast Asian studies scholars
Austrian ethnologists
Academic staff of the University of Vienna
People associated with the American Museum of Natural History
Emigrants from Austria to the United States after the Anschluss